Youngsan University Station is a station of Busan Metro Line 4 in Bansong-dong, Haeundae District, Busan, South Korea. The station name comes from the nearby Youngsan University.

Station Layout

Gallery

External links

  Cyber station information from Busan Transportation Corporation

Busan Metro stations
Haeundae District
Railway stations opened in 2011